Richie Woodhall (born 17 April 1968) is a British former professional boxer who competed from 1990 to 2000. He held the WBC super-middleweight title from 1998 to 1999, as well as the Commonwealth middleweight title from 1992 to 1995, and the European middleweight title from 1995 to 1996. As an amateur, Woodhall won a gold medal at the 1990 Commonwealth Games and bronze at the 1988 Summer Olympics, both in the light-middleweight division.

Following his retirement from the sport, Woodhall has developed a broadcasting career with both the BBC and BT Sport as a sports pundit, on both television and radio. He currently co-commentates with Mike Costello on radio for some shows, while co-commentating with John Rawling on Setanta Sports at other times. He was also involved with the 2012 Olympics held in London, commentating on the fights alongside Jim Neilly and coaching the Olympic boxing squad. After appearing as a body double for Brad Pitt in the 2000 film Snatch, he has dedicated himself to developing as a performer.

Amateur career
Olympic Games Bronze Medalist, Seoul South Korea 1988, losing to Roy Jones, Jr..
Commonwealth Games Gold Medallist, Auckland New Zealand 1990
England International Contests – 43

Olympic results
1st round bye
Defeated Desmond Williams (Sierra Leone) 5-0
Defeated Apolinario Silveira (Angola) 5-0
Defeated Rey Rivera (Puerto Rico) 5-0
Lost to Roy Jones Jr. (United States) 5-0

Professional career
Woodhall turned pro in 1990 and was undefeated as the Commonwealth Middleweight Champion from 1992 to 1995. He was then undefeated as the European Middleweight Champion from 1995 to 1996.

Woodhall defeated a number of useful fighters during this period, including; Future World Super Middle and World Light Heavyweight Champion Silvio Branco, Art Serwarno, Heath Todd, Jacques LeBlanc, Zdravko Kostic, Derek Wormald, Vito Gaudiosi and Royan Hammond.

In late 1996 he fought WBC middleweight title holder Keith Holmes. Woodhall went into this fight carrying an injury, but took the fight anyway. Woodhall did not perform as well has he might otherwise have, losing by 12th-round TKO.

In 1998 he moved up to Super Middleweight and after a tune up against Bernice Barber captured the WBC super middleweight title with a unanimous decision win over Thulani Malinga.  
He successfully defended the title twice, defeating fellow Briton and future World Champion Glenn Catley and former World Champ Vincenzo Nardiello before losing it to Markus Beyer by decision in 1999, a fight in which Woodhall was down in the 1st and twice in the 3rd. Woodhall rallied late in the fight and came close to stopping Beyer, however his revival came too late.

Woodhall bounced back with a win over the experienced Errol McDonald, setting him up for his final bout against Joe Calzaghe for the WBO super middleweight title.

Woodhall was TKO'd in 10 rounds by Joe Calzaghe in an exciting fight in which Calzaghe always had the edge.

Woodhall retired after this bout which took place on 16 December 2000.

Personal life
Woodhall grew up in Woodside, Telford but also lived in Malinslee and attended the local Abraham Darby School. He is also a keen supporter of West Bromwich Albion F.C. He currently resides in Lightmoor, Telford,  Shropshire.

Woodhall also is a reporter for BBC Midlands' Inside Out Programme . He is married to childhood sweetheart Jayne and has 3 children, Jack, Jake and eldest daughter and aspiring actress Amy Woodhall, who has appeared in television shows such as Emmerdale and Coronation Street.

In film
Woodhall was a body double for Brad Pitt in a fight scene in the movie Snatch, directed by Guy Ritchie. He trained Matthew Marsden for his role in the movie Shiner.

Professional boxing record

References

External links

English male boxers
Olympic boxers of Great Britain
World boxing champions
Commonwealth Games gold medallists for England
Olympic bronze medallists for Great Britain
Boxers at the 1988 Summer Olympics
Boxers at the 1990 Commonwealth Games
People from Telford
1968 births
Living people
Olympic medalists in boxing
Medalists at the 1988 Summer Olympics
Commonwealth Games medallists in boxing
World super-middleweight boxing champions
World Boxing Council champions
Commonwealth Boxing Council champions
European Boxing Union champions
Light-middleweight boxers
Medallists at the 1990 Commonwealth Games